Poland will compete at the 2020 Winter Youth Olympics in Lausanne, Switzerland from 9 to 22 January 2020.

Medalists

Olympic Crew
Polish Olympic Chief during 2020 Winter Youth Olympics is Konrad Niedźwiedzki, bronze medalist in long track speed skating on 2014 Winter Olympics in Sochi, Russia. His assistants are: Luiza Złotkowska (also speed skater) and Marcin Doroś. Press attachés are: Szymon Sikora and Tomasz Piechal. Poland sends also 2 medics: Edyta Śleszycka and Jarosław Bortnowski supported by 2 physiotherapists: Magdalena Gąsowska and Mateusz Ołownia.

Alpine skiing

Boys

Girls

Biathlon

Boys

Girls

Mixed

Curling

Poland for 2020 Winter Youth Olympics sends a mixed team of four athletes: Klaudia Szmidt, Monika Wosińska, Robert Kamiński, Dominik Szmidt. They will be supported by their coach, Damian Herman.

Mixed team

Mixed doubles

Figure skating

One female Polish Skater earned a spot based on the 2019–20 ISU Junior Grand Prix.

Ice hockey

Short track speed skating

Three Polish skaters achieved quota places for Poland based on the results of the 2019 World Junior Short Track Speed Skating Championships.

Boys

Girls

Speed skating

Six Polish skaters achieved quota place for Poland based on the results of the 2019 World Junior Speed Skating Championships.
Boys

Girls

Mixed team sprint

See also
Poland at the 2020 Summer Olympics

References

2020 in Polish sport
Nations at the 2020 Winter Youth Olympics
Poland at the Youth Olympics